CUBE is a German bicycle brand.

History 
The company was founded in 1993 by Marcus Pürner, who began with an area of 50 m2 in his father's furniture factory in Waldershof, Germany. The company has expanded its production area to 55,000 m2 and sells to more than 60 countries all over the world. They currently sponsor Intermarché–Wanty–Gobert Matériaux.

In May 2021, the company applied for the construction of a 160-meter-long and 50 meter high high-bay warehouse in Waldershof. However, this project is controversial, with some local and regional residents expressing concerns about the appearance of the landscape and environmental protection. On June 10, 2021, Bavarian television broadcast a report about the planned construction in the magazine quer.

Products 
The current product range consists of various types of mountain bikes, road bikes, cross bikes, triathlon bikes, e-bikes as well as trekking bikes. Ergonomically fitted women's bikes, bikes for kids, wear and accessories complete the product line-up.

Pilots & Teams 
 CUBE Action Team: Nicolas Lau, Gusti Wildhaber, André Wagenknecht and Daniel Schemmel & Newest Member Andrew Thomsen.
 CUBE Global Squad: Greg Williamson, Jessie and bramble (UNNO factory racing) and Matt Walker.
 Triathlon: Lucy Charles-Barclay, Raelert Brothers (Andreas und Michael Raelert), Daniela Sämmler, Svenja Bazlen, Céline Schärer, Malte Bruns
 Factory Pilots: Nicole und Lothar Leder, Louis Wolf, Lisa Breckner, Gerd Schönfelder, Team Erdinger Alkoholfrei, Team Strassacker, MHW CUBE Racing Team
 Factory Co-Pilots

References

External links 
 Cube EU Site
 Cube Action Team official page

Companies based in Bavaria
Mountain bike manufacturers
Cycle parts manufacturers
Cycle manufacturers of Germany
Vehicle manufacturing companies established in 1993
1993 establishments in Germany